Hadji Hassan Mahala is the third biggest Roma ghetto in Plovdiv, Bulgaria. With a population of 8,000, residents generally regard themselves as being of the Turkish ethnicity. They do not identify themselves as part of the communities living in Stolipinovo and Sheker Mahala.

Neighbourhoods in Plovdiv
Romani communities in Bulgaria